General Trias International FC was a Filipino association football club composed wholly of South Korean players, based in General Trias, Cavite and a member of Cavite Football Association. The club participated in the United Football League in 2013.

History

UFL Cup 
General Trias International F.C. debuted in 2012 UFL Cup as one of the guest teams and reached the quarter-finals of the Cup after they were defeated by eventual champions Stallion. The club also advanced to the 2013 PFF National Men's Club Championship after they ranked in the Top 10 of 2012 UFL Cup.

PFF National Men's Club Championship 

General Trias International F.C. qualified in the 2013 PFF National Men's Club Championship and reached the quarter-finals after they were defeated by PSG.

Current squad

References 

 

Football clubs in the Philippines
2011 establishments in the Philippines
Sports in Cavite